Bluecoat is a style of school uniform used in some British schools.

Bluecoat or Blue Coat may also refer to:

Education 
 Bluecoat school, any of several individual British schools
 Charity school in UK, formerly known as Blue Coat school
 A House at The King's Hospital school, Dublin

Companies 
 Blue Coat Systems, a proxy-server manufacturer previously known as CacheFlow
 Bluecoat Press, a Liverpool-based publisher

Buildings 
 Blue School, Dublin which housed the Irish Houses of Parliament before 1729
 Law Society of Ireland offices, in the former Blue Coat School buildings
 Bluecoat Chambers, oldest building in central Liverpool and home of the Bluecoat arts centre

Other uses 
 Operation Bluecoat, a British offensive during World War II in 1944
 Bluecoats Drum and Bugle Corps, based in Canton, Ohio
 Bluecoats, members of the entertainment staff at Pontin's holiday camps in the United Kingdom
 American soldiers, marines or sailors who traditionally wore blue uniforms
 Les Tuniques Bleues, a comic about American Civil War soldiers